The Soaring Maiden (German: Die schwebende Jungfrau) is a 1931 German comedy film directed by Carl Boese and starring Lissy Arna, S.Z. Sakall and Dina Gralla. It was shot at the Halensee Studios in Berlin. The film's sets were designed by the art director Franz Schroedter.

Cast
 Lissy Arna as Sonja, Detektivin  
 S.Z. Sakall as Onkel Lampe 
 Dina Gralla as Strandnixe 
 Fritz Schulz as Paul Brandt, Lawyer
 Paul Kemp as Dr. Kurt Winter  
 Fee Malten as Lilly, Elses Schwester  
 Hilde von Stolz as Else Brandt, Ehefrau  
 Adele Sandrock as Tante Malchen 
 Kurt Lilien as Kriminalkommissar 
 Max Ehrlich
 Vicky Werckmeister
 Paul Westermeier

References

Bibliography 
 Klaus, Ulrich J. Deutsche Tonfilme: Jahrgang 1931. Klaus-Archiv, 2006.
 Waldman, Harry. Nazi Films in America, 1933-1942. McFarland, 2008.

External links 
 

1931 films
1931 comedy films
Films of the Weimar Republic
German comedy films
1930s German-language films
Films directed by Carl Boese
German films based on plays
German black-and-white films
Films shot at Halensee Studios
1930s German films